Makkal (ml; മക്കൾ) (English: Children) is a 2018 Indian Malayalam television series directed by Faisal Adimali. The show premiered on Mazhavil Manorama channel on Mondays to Fridays at 7:30 PM and later shifted to 7:00 PM due to poor TRP ratings.

Plot
The show revolves around the love, affection and ignorance between an elderly couple and their children. The kind of life they lead despite having their own children is a major factor in the story.

Cast
Lead Cast
 Dinesh Panicker as Madhavan
 Fathima Babu / Shobha Mohan as Saraswathi
 Jeevan Gopal as Mahesh a.k.a. Mahi
 Supporting Cast
 Hari Nambotha as Anandhu 
Seetha lakshmi as Babitha
 Saritha B Nair as Sunanda
 Shobi Thilakan as Paramu
 Rudra Pradap as Prasanna Kumar
 Sandra Babu as Devika
   Reena Basheer/ Shemi Martin as Maya
 Rekha Krishnappa as Mythili
Rajesh Hebbar as Devan
Boban Alummoodan as Jayaraj
 Nivas Ravi as Ajith
 Shehana as Nayana
 Krishnaprasad as Gopan
 Kalyan Khanna as Anandhu
Ranjith Raj as Raj
Deepan Murali as Senthil
Thirumala Ramachandran as Bhadran
Sunitha as Subbu
Romel Rajesh as Kevin
Varsha
Archana Menon
Shobi Thilakan
Aiswarya Devi

Guest Appearance
Lal Jose as Himself (episode 1)

References 

2018 Indian television series debuts
2018 Indian television series endings
Malayalam-language television shows
Mazhavil Manorama original programming